Chimeneas is a municipality located in the province of Granada, Spain. According to the 2005 census (INE), the city has a population of 1485 inhabitants.

References

Municipalities in the Province of Granada